Combinatorial Chemistry & High Throughput Screening is a peer-reviewed scientific journal that covers combinatorial chemistry. It was established in 1998 and is published by Bentham Science Publishers. The editor-in-chief is Gerald H. Lushington (LiS Consulting, Lawrence, KS, USA). The journal has 5 sections: Combinatorial/ Medicinal Chemistry, Chemo/Bio Informatics, High Throughput Screening, Pharmacognosy, and Laboratory Automation.

Abstracting and indexing 
The journal is abstracted and indexed in:

According to the Journal Citation Reports, the journal has a 2014 impact factor of 1.222, ranking it 40th out of 70 journals in the category "Chemistry, Applied".

References

External links 
 

Biochemistry journals
Bentham Science Publishers academic journals
Publications established in 1998
English-language journals
Combinatorial chemistry